Christiaan Harmse (born 31 May 1973) is a South African hammer thrower. He has broken the African record seven times, and holds the championship record for both the African Championships and All-Africa Games.

He has been a dominant presence in African hammer throwing since his first African Championships in Athletics in 1998 where he took gold with a championship record throw. He then went on to claim four consecutive African titles between 2002 and 2008, improving his own record along the way. His performances at the All-Africa Games have been equally dominant – he won his first title at the 1999 Games with a Games record and won twice more consecutively in 2003 and 2007, improving his record both times.

Although he won bronze medals at the 1998 and 2006 Commonwealth Games, he has had considerably less success on the world stage – despite four appearances at the World Championships in Athletics in his career, he has never qualified for the final of the event. Furthermore, he has never represented South Africa at the Olympics as he does not compete on Sundays, due to his religious views. Harmse is only the second Olympian to withdraw from the games for religious reasons.

His personal best throw is 80.63 metres, achieved in April 2005 in Durban. This is the former African record, being beaten in 2014 by Mostafa Al-Gamel from Egypt.

On 22 April 2017, Harmse won his twenty-second consecutive national title at the South African Championships in Potchefstroom – a record unmatched by any athlete at the country's national championships. This has also been recorded as a World Record for most consecutive National Athletic Titles. He achieved this by besting Renaldo Frechou, whom himself gained the lead on his last throw with a distance of 70.30 meters. Tshepang Makhethe unfortunately threw a foul on his last. Chris stepped into the circle and threw a distance of 70.53 meters.

A 44-year-old Harmse extended his world record to 23 consecutive national titles with a throw of 70.62 m at the 2018 South African Championships, forcing Makhethe to settle for second place. His streak finally ended at the 2019 edition, where Harmse took the silver medal with 71.70 m as Makhethe had a personal best throw of 72.25 m to win gold.

International competitions

References

External links
 

1973 births
Living people
South African male hammer throwers
Commonwealth Games gold medallists for South Africa
Commonwealth Games bronze medallists for South Africa
Commonwealth Games medallists in athletics
Athletes (track and field) at the 1998 Commonwealth Games
Athletes (track and field) at the 2006 Commonwealth Games
Athletes (track and field) at the 2010 Commonwealth Games
Athletes (track and field) at the 2015 African Games
World Athletics Championships athletes for South Africa
African Games gold medalists for South Africa
African Games medalists in athletics (track and field)
South African Athletics Championships winners
African Championships in Athletics winners
Medallists at the 1998 Commonwealth Games
Medallists at the 2010 Commonwealth Games